Douglas Warwick Armstrong  (13 April 1931 – 18 February 2015) was a New Zealand cricketer, television sports broadcaster and local-body politician. He served as mayor of Rodney District from 1992 to 2000.

Cricket career
Born in Wellington in 1931, Armstrong was a slow left-arm orthodox bowler and tail-end batsman. He played two first-class matches for Central Districts in the 1958–59 season, and also appeared for Manawatu and Wanganui in four Hawke Cup matches between 1956 and 1964.

Broadcasting career

Armstrong was a sports presenter on TVNZ in the 1980s.

Political career
Armstrong was elected mayor of Rodney District in 1992, succeeding Sir Gordon Mason. He was re-elected at the local-body elections in 1995 and 1998, but council in-fighting led to his resignation in 2000.

In the 1998 Queen's Birthday Honours, Armstrong was appointed a Companion of the Queen's Service Order for public services. He died in Whanganui in 2015.

References

1931 births
2015 deaths
People from Wellington City
New Zealand cricketers
Central Districts cricketers
New Zealand television presenters
Mayors of Rodney District
Companions of the Queen's Service Order
New Zealand justices of the peace